Mārtiņš Pļaviņš (born 8 May 1985 in Riga) is a Latvian beach volleyball player.

He teamed up with Aleksandrs Samoilovs in 2004. Pļaviņš and team mate Samoilovs represented Latvia at the 2008 Summer Olympics in Beijing, China after which they stopped playing together.

At the 2008 Olympics, the #21-ranked Latvian team achieved a major upset in the preliminary round, beating the #1-ranked team of Todd Rogers and Phil Dalhausser (United States). Latvian team won its preliminary round group and in round of 16 lost to Austrian team Florian Gosch and Alexander Horst.

After the 2008 Olympics, he began playing together with Jānis Šmēdiņš.  At the 2010 European Beach Volleyball Championships, Pļaviņš and Šmēdiņš won the bronze medal.  They followed this up by winning the bronze medal at the 2012 Summer Olympics.  They lost to Rego and Cerutti of Brazil in the semi-final but beat Nummerdor and Schuil of the Netherlands in the bronze medal match.

References

External links
 
 
 
 
 
 

1985 births
Living people
Latvian beach volleyball players
Men's beach volleyball players
Beach volleyball players at the 2008 Summer Olympics
Beach volleyball players at the 2012 Summer Olympics
Olympic beach volleyball players of Latvia
Olympic bronze medalists for Latvia
Olympic medalists in beach volleyball
Medalists at the 2012 Summer Olympics
Beach volleyball players at the 2015 European Games
European Games medalists in beach volleyball
European Games gold medalists for Latvia
Riga State Gymnasium No.1 alumni
Latvian Academy of Sport Education alumni
Sportspeople from Riga
Beach volleyball defenders
Beach volleyball players at the 2020 Summer Olympics
21st-century Latvian people